Åkers IF, abbreviated ÅIF, is a Swedish sports club founded in 1918 and based in Åkers styckebruk. As of 2013, the club has sections competing in association football, gymnastics, orienteering, and skiing.

As of 2006, the club also ran sections for athletics, basketball, floorball, handball, and ice hockey. The club has also run sections for bandy and cross country running. The ice hockey section merged with Strängnäs HC in 2012 to become its own club, Åker/Strängnäs HC. That club currently plays in the modern Hockeyettan, the third tier of Swedish hockey, . Before the merger, the ice hockey section had played two seasons in Division I when it was the top tier of Swedish hockey (1946–47 and 1953–54).

References

External links
 Official website

Sport in Södermanland County
Sports clubs in Sweden
Football clubs in Södermanland County
Gymnastics clubs
Orienteering clubs in Sweden
Ski clubs in Sweden
1918 establishments in Sweden
Sports clubs established in 1918
Association football clubs established in 1918
Bandy clubs established in 1918
Defunct bandy clubs in Sweden
Defunct basketball teams in Sweden
Defunct ice hockey teams in Sweden